The 1909 Syracuse Orangemen football team represented Syracuse University during the 1909 college football season. The head coach was Tad Jones, coaching his first season with the Orangemen. The team played their home games at Archbold Stadium in Syracuse, New York.

Schedule

References

Syracuse
Syracuse Orange football seasons
Syracuse Orangemen football